Italy competed at the 2016 Summer Olympics in Rio de Janeiro, Brazil, from 5 to 21 August 2016. Italy has competed in every Summer Olympics, except the 1904 Summer Olympics in St. Louis.

Medalists

Italy's medalists.

| width="78%" align="left" valign="top" |

|  style="text-align:left; width:22%; vertical-align:top;"|

Competitors

| width=78% align=left valign=top |
The following is the list of number of competitors participating in the Games. Note that reserves in fencing, field hockey, football, and handball are not counted as athletes:

Archery

Three Italian archers qualified for the men's events after having secured a top eight finish in the men's team recurve at the 2015 World Archery Championships in Copenhagen, Denmark. Another set of three archers qualified for the women's events by virtue of the nation's podium finish in the team recurve competition at the 2016 Archery World Cup meet in Antalya, Turkey.

The full Italian archery team, led by London 2012 champions Marco Galiazzo and Mauro Nespoli was named on July 6, 2016.

Men

Women

Athletics

Italian athletes have so far achieved qualifying standards in the following athletics events (up to a maximum of 3 athletes in each event):

Following the end of the qualifying period, a total of 35 athletes (15 men and 20 women) were officially named to Italy's track and field roster for the Games on July 14, 2016, with triple jumper and London 2012 bronze medalist Fabrizio Donato matching the record with sprinter Pietro Mennea as the only men competing in five straight Olympics. A day later, high jumper and London 2012 Olympian Gianmarco Tamberi was forced to withdraw from the team after sustaining a partial rupture of his ankle ligament shortly upon clearing a national record of 2.39 m in Monaco. Three more athletes (Lingua, Magnani, & Malavisi) were added to the team on July 18, bringing the roster size to 38. On 27 July, Jamel Chatbi was suspended for missing out the doping test.

Track & road events
Men

Women

Field events
Men

Women

Badminton

Italy has qualified one badminton player for the women's singles into the Olympic tournament. Having previously competed for Switzerland in Beijing 2008, Jeanine Cicognini  claimed her second Olympic spot as one of top 34 individual shuttlers in the BWF World Rankings as of 5 May 2016.

Boxing

Italy has entered six boxers to compete in the following weight classes into the Olympic boxing tournament. Valentino Manfredonia became the first Italian boxer to be selected to the Olympic team with a top two finish in the World Series of Boxing, while two-time Olympic silver medalist Clemente Russo did so in the AIBA Pro Boxing series.

Three further boxers, including London 2012 Olympians Manuel Cappai and bronze medalist Vincenzo Mangiacapre,  claimed their Olympic spots at the 2016 European Qualification Tournament in Samsun, Turkey. Meanwhile, Guido Vianello secured an additional place on the Italian roster as the winner and sole recipient of the men's super heavyweight division at the 2016 AIBA World Qualifying Tournament in Baku, Azerbaijan. Carmine Tommasone completed the nation's boxing lineup with his box-off victory at the 2016 APB and WSB Olympic Qualifier in Vargas, Venezuela.

Men

Women

Canoeing

Slalom
Italian canoeists have qualified a maximum of one boat in each of the following classes through the 2015 ICF Canoe Slalom World Championships. Giovanni de Gennaro and Stefanie Horn were selected to the Italian team on May 15, 2016, as a result of their performances at the 2016 European Canoe Slalom Championships.

Sprint
Italian canoeists have qualified two boats in each of the following distances for the Games by virtue of a top two finish at the 2016 European Qualification Regatta in Duisburg, Germany. As a response to the "multiple positive" cases on doping that provoked a one-year suspension for Belarus and Romania, the men's K-4 1000 m crew (Crenna, Dressino, Ricchetti, & Ripamonti) received a spare berth from the International Canoe Federation for the Italians.

Qualification Legend: FA = Qualify to final (medal); FB = Qualify to final B (non-medal)

Cycling

Road
Italian riders qualified for the following quota places in the men's and women's Olympic road race by virtue of their top 15 final national ranking in the 2015 UCI World Tour (for men) and top 22 in the UCI World Ranking (for women). The road cycling team was officially named to the Italian roster on July 17, 2016.

Men

Women

Track
Following the completion of the 2016 UCI Track Cycling World Championships, Italian riders have accumulated spots in the women's team pursuit, as well as the men's omnium. The full Italian track cycling team was named on July 17, 2016.

Pursuit

Omnium

Mountain biking
Italian mountain bikers qualified for three men's and one women's quota place into the Olympic cross-country race, as a result of the nation's fifth-place finish for men and fourteenth for women, respectively, in the UCI Olympic Ranking List of May 25, 2016. The mountain biking team, highlighted by London 2012 bronze medalist Marco Aurelio Fontana, was named to the Olympic roster on June 1, 2016.

Diving

Italian divers qualified for the following individual spots and synchronized teams at the Olympics through the 2015 FINA World Championships and the 2016 FINA World Cup series.

Men

Women

Equestrian

Italy has fielded a composite squad of three riders into the Olympic team eventing by virtue of the following results in the individual FEI Olympic rankings: a top finish from South Western Europe, and two top nine finishes from the combined overall FEI Olympic rankings. One dressage and jumping rider has been added each to the squad into the Olympic equestrian competition by virtue of their top six and top four finishes, respectively, outside the group selection in the individual FEI Olympic Rankings.

On June 28, 2016, the International Federation for Equestrian Sports (FEI)  awarded an additional berth to the fourth Italian eventing rider, as the next highest-ranked eligible individual, not yet qualified, in the FEI Olympic rankings, after Belarus rejected the Olympic spot.

Dressage

Eventing

Jumping

Fencing

Italian fencers have qualified a full squad each in the men's team épée and men's team foil by virtue of their top 4 national finish in the FIE Olympic Team Rankings, while the women's sabre team has claimed the spot as the highest ranking team from Europe outside the world's top four.

Multiple Olympic men's sabre medalists Diego Occhiuzzi and Aldo Montano, along with London 2012 champion Elisa Di Francisca and runner-up Arianna Errigo, both in women's foil,  claimed their spots on the Italian team by finishing among the top 14 fencers in the FIE Adjusted Official Rankings, while Rossella Fiamingo did the same feat in women's épée as the highest-ranked fencer coming from the Europe zone.

The fencing team was officially selected to the Italian roster for the Games on June 27, 2016.

Men

Women

Golf 

Italy has entered four golfers (two per gender) into the Olympic tournament. Nino Bertasio (world no. 299), Matteo Manassero (world no. 342), Giulia Molinaro (world no. 251), and Giulia Sergas (world no. 326) qualified directly among the top 60 eligible players for their respective individual events based on the IGF World Rankings as of 11 July 2016.

Gymnastics

Artistic
Italy fielded a full squad of six artistic gymnasts (one man and five women) into the Olympic competition. The women's team qualified through a top eight finish at the 2015 World Artistic Gymnastics Championships in Glasgow. Meanwhile, Ludovico Edalli secured his Olympic spot as a lone Italian male gymnast in the apparatus and individual all-around events at the Olympic Test Event in Rio de Janeiro. The artistic gymnastics team was named to the Italian roster for the Games on July 10, 2016.

Men

Women
Team

Individual finals

Rhythmic
Italy has qualified a squad of rhythmic gymnasts for the group all-around by finishing in the top 10 (for group) at the 2015 World Championships in Stuttgart, Germany. Meanwhile, an additional Olympic berth was awarded to the Italian female gymnast, who participated in the individual all-around at the Olympic Test Event in Rio de Janeiro. The rhythmic gymnastics team, led by London 2012 bronze medalist Marta Pagnini, was named on July 10, 2016.

Judo

Italy has qualified a total of six judokas for each of the following weight classes at the Games. Elios Manzi, Fabio Basile, Odette Giuffrida, and London 2012 Olympian Edwige Gwend were ranked among the top 22 eligible judokas for men and top 14 for women in the IJF World Ranking List of May 30, 2016, while Matteo Marconcini at men's half-middleweight (81 kg) earned a continental quota spot from the European region, as the highest-ranked Italian judoka outside of direct qualifying position.

On June 30, 2016, the International Judo Federation  awarded a spare Olympic berth freed up by Palau to Valentina Moscatt at women's extra-lightweight (48 kg), as one of the highest-ranked eligible judokas, not yet qualified, across all genders and continents on the list.

Modern pentathlon

Italy has qualified a total of four modern pentathletes for the following events at the Games. Riccardo De Luca secured a selection in the men's event by winning the 2015 UIPM World Cup Final in Minsk, Belarus, while Alice Sotero gained a place in the women's event through the European Championships. Pierpaolo Petroni and London 2012 Olympian Claudia Cesarini were ranked among the top 10 modern pentathletes, not yet qualified, in their respective events based on the UIPM World Rankings as of June 1, 2016.

Rowing

Italy has qualified a total of eight boats for each of the following rowing classes into the Olympic regatta. Five rowing crews confirmed Olympic places for their boats at the 2015 FISA World Championships in Lac d'Aiguebelette, France, while the women's pair rowers added one more boat to the Italian roster as a result of their top four finish at the 2016 European & Final Qualification Regatta in Lucerne, Switzerland.

A total of 16 rowers (14 men and 2 women), highlighted by London 2012 silver medalist Romano Battisti (men's double sculls), were officially named to the Italian roster for the Games on July 13, 2016.

On July 26, 2016, two more boats (men's eight and women's lightweight double sculls) were awarded to the Italian rowing team, as a response to the removal of four boats held by the Russians from FISA due to their previous doping bans and their implications in the "disappearing positive methodology" set out in the McClaren Report on Russia's state-sponsored doping.

Men

Women

Qualification Legend: FA=Final A (medal); FB=Final B (non-medal); FC=Final C (non-medal); FD=Final D (non-medal); FE=Final E (non-medal); FF=Final F (non-medal); SA/B=Semifinals A/B; SC/D=Semifinals C/D; SE/F=Semifinals E/F; QF=Quarterfinals; R=Repechage

Sailing

Italian sailors have qualified one boat in each of the following classes through the 2014 ISAF Sailing World Championships, the individual fleet Worlds, and European qualifying regattas.

Following their podium finish at the 2015 49er & 49erFX World Championships, 2012 Olympians Giulia Conti and Francesca Clapcich became the first Italian sailors to be selected for Rio regatta. By the end of 2015, two more crews joined Conti and Clapcich in the Italian Olympic sailing squad: Vittorio Bissaro and Silvia Sicouri (Nacra 17), and Flavia Tartaglini (RS:X). Two further sailors (Camboni & Marrai) sealed their Olympic spots at the Princess Sofia Trophy regatta, while the remaining sailing crews (except the men's 470) rounded out the Italian selection on the last week of May 2016. The sailing crews were formally named to the Olympic roster on June 2, 2016.

Men

Women

Mixed

M = Medal race; EL = Eliminated – did not advance into the medal race

Shooting

Italian shooters have achieved quota places for the following events by virtue of their best finishes at the 2014 and 2015 ISSF World Championships, the 2015 ISSF World Cup series, and European Championships or Games, as long as they obtained a minimum qualifying score (MQS) by March 31, 2016.

On February 19, 2016, the Italian Shotgun Federation  officially announced the names of the nine shooters to compete in Rio 2016, including Olympic champions Jessica Rossi in women's trap (2012) and Chiara Cainero in women's skeet (2008), 2012 Olympic runner-up Massimo Fabbrizi, and triple Olympic medalist Giovanni Pellielo, who has been set to appear at his seventh Games, both in men's trap. Meanwhile, five other shooters competing in the rifle and pistol events were named to the Olympic roster, with Niccolò Campriani aiming to defend his title in the men's 50 m rifle 3 positions.

Italy secured an additional quota place in the men's 50 m pistol at the 2015 European Shooting Championships, but the Italian Olympic Committee chose to exchange it with the men's 25 m rapid fire pistol instead based on performances throughout the qualifying period. The slot was awarded to rookie Riccardo Mazzetti.

Men

Women

Qualification Legend: Q = Qualify for the next round; q = Qualify for the bronze medal (shotgun)

Swimming

Italian swimmers have so far achieved qualifying standards in the following events (up to a maximum of 2 swimmers in each event at the Olympic Qualifying Time (OQT), and potentially 1 at the Olympic Selection Time (OST)):

With the successful podium finish at the 2015 FINA World Championships, long-freestyle distance aces Gregorio Paltrinieri and upcoming four-time Olympian Federica Pellegrini became the first Italian swimmers to be selected to the Olympic team for Rio 2016. The rest of the Italian swimmers must attain the federation's entry standards at three selection meets to confirm their places for the Games: Italian Nationals in Riccione (April 19 to 23), European Championships in London (May 16 to 22), and Sette Colli trophy in Rome (June 24 to 26).

On June 30, 2016, the Italian Olympic Committee  nominated a total of 38 swimmers (20 men and 18 women) for the Games. Eighteen of them, including Paltrinieri and Pellegrini, were directly qualified under the federation's entry standards in three-meet selection process, while others were added to the roster upon the federation's discretionary selection criteria.

Men

Women

Synchronized swimming

Italy has fielded a squad of nine synchronized swimmers to compete in both the women's team and duet routine by virtue of their third-place finish at the FINA Olympic test event in Rio de Janeiro.

Tennis

Italy has entered seven tennis players (four men and three women) into the Olympic tournament. Two-time Olympian Andreas Seppi (world no. 40), along with his colleagues Fabio Fognini (world no. 34) and rookie Paolo Lorenzi (world no. 57), qualified directly for the men's singles as three of the top 56 eligible players in the ATP World Rankings, while Roberta Vinci (world no. 7), Sara Errani (world no. 22), and Karin Knapp (world no. 93) did so for the women's singles based on their WTA World Rankings as of June 6, 2016.

On June 30, 2016, the International Tennis Federation  awarded one of the Olympic women's singles places to three-time Olympian Francesca Schiavone, as Italy's top-ranked player outside of direct qualifying position, but she decided to reject the invitation. On July 30, 2016, Thomas Fabbiano (world no. 112) received a spare ITF Olympic place following the withdrawal of several tennis players from the Games.

Men

Women

Mixed

Triathlon

Italy has qualified a total of four triathletes for the following events at the Olympics. London 2012 Olympians Alessandro Fabian, Davide Uccellari, and Annamaria Mazzetti, along with Charlotte Bonin, were ranked among the top 43 eligible triathletes each in the men's and women's event, respectively, based on the ITU Olympic Qualification List as of May 15, 2016.

Volleyball

Beach
Three Italian beach volleyball teams (one men's pair and two women's pairs) qualified directly for the Olympics by virtue of their nation's top 15 placement in the FIVB Olympic Rankings as of June 13, 2016. Among the beach volleyball players featured London 2012 Olympians Marta Menegatti and duo Daniele Lupo and Paolo Nicolai.

On 3 August 2016, Viktoria Orsi Toth was excluded from the women's tournament due to positive doping test for clostebol before the competitions.

Indoor

Men's tournament

Italy men's volleyball team qualified for the Olympics by attaining a top two finish at the 2015 FIVB World Cup in Japan.

Team roster

Group play

Quarterfinal

Semifinal

Gold medal match

Women's tournament

Italy women's volleyball team qualified for the Olympics by virtue of a top three national finish at the first meet of the World Olympic Qualifying Tournament in Tokyo, Japan.

Team roster

Group play

Water polo

Summary

Men's tournament

Italy men's water polo team qualified for the Olympics by virtue of a top four finish at the Olympic Qualification Tournament in Trieste.

Team roster

Group play

Quarterfinal

Semifinal

Bronze medal match

Women's tournament

Italy women's water polo team qualified for the Olympics by virtue of a top four finish at the Olympic Qualification Tournament in Gouda.

Team roster

Group play

Quarterfinal

Semifinal

Gold medal match

Weightlifting

Italy has qualified one male and one female weightlifter for the Rio Olympics by virtue of a top seven national finish (for men) and top six (for women), respectively, at the 2016 European Championships. The team must allocate these places to individual athletes by June 20, 2016.

The Italian Olympic Committee  selected London 2012 Olympian Mirco Scarantino and rookie Giorgia Bordignon to the weightlifting team for the Games.

Wrestling

Italy has qualified two wrestlers for each of the following weight classes into the Olympic competition. One of them finished among the top six to book an Olympic spot in the men's freestyle 65 kg at the 2015 World Championships, while the other  claimed the remaining Olympic slot in the men's Greco-Roman 98 kg to round out the Italian roster at the final meet of the World Qualification Tournament in Istanbul.

Men's freestyle

Men's Greco-Roman

See also
Italy at the 2016 Summer Paralympics

References

External links 

 Italian Olympic Team – Rio 2016 Olympic Coverage 
 

Olympics
2016
Nations at the 2016 Summer Olympics